Seven Devils is a solitaire card game.

Seven Devils may also refer to:

 Seven Devils, North Carolina
 Seven Devils Mountains, Idaho
 "Seven Devils", a track on the Florence and the Machine album Ceremonials
 Seven Devils Lake, Arkansas
 Seven Devils State Recreation Site, Oregon